Sadik Baş (born 11 May 1994), is a Turkish professional footballer who plays as a winger for Hatayspor.

Professional career
Baş is a youth product of the youth academies of Hüdavendigar Dikkaldırımspor, Makospor, Burgazspor, Bursa Nilüferspor and Mudanyaspor. He began his senior career with Bursa Nilüferspor in 2013, and followed that up with stints with Tuzlaspor and Eyüpspor in the TFF Second League. On 3 June 2021, signed his first professional contract with Hatayspor. He made his professional debut with Hatayspor in a 2–1 Süper Lig loss to Galatasaray on 23 August 2021.

References

External links
 
 
 Mackolik Profile

1994 births
Living people
Sportspeople from Bursa
Turkish footballers
Hatayspor footballers
Süper Lig players
TFF Second League players
TFF Third League players
Association football wingers